Electoral history of John Sherman, Representative, United States Senator, and cabinet member.

United States House of Representatives
Ohio's 13th congressional district, 1854:
John Sherman (AN: 8,617 (59.80%)
William D. Lindsley (D): 5,794 (40.21%)

Ohio's 13th congressional district, 1856:
John Sherman (inc.) (R): 9,926 (58.42%)
Herman J. Brumback (D): 7,065 (41.58%)

Ohio's 13th congressional district, 1858:
John Sherman (R) (inc.): 9,426 (57.06%)
 Shepard J. Patrick (D): 7,095 (42.95%)

Ohio's 13th congressional district, 1860:
John Sherman (R) (inc.): 11,428 (57.16%)
Barnabas Burns (D): 8,564 (42.84%)

United States Senate
United States Senate election in Ohio, 1861 (elected by state legislature):
John Sherman (R) (inc.): 76 (58.91%)
William Kennon, Sr. (D): 53 (41.09%)

United States Senate election in Ohio, 1866 (elected by state legislature):
John Sherman (R) (inc.): 91 (68.93%)
Allen G. Thurman (D): 41 (31.07%)

United States Senate election in Ohio, 1872 (elected by state legislature):
John Sherman (R) (inc.): 73 (52.14%)
George W. Morgan (D): 64 (45.71%)
Jacob Dolson Cox (R): 1 (0.71%)
Robert C. Schenck (R): 1 (0.71%)
Aaron F. Perry (R) : 1 (0.71%)

United States Senate election in Ohio, 1881 (elected by state legislature):
John Sherman (R) (inc.): 84 (61.76%)
Allen G. Thurman (D): 52 (38.24%)

United States Senate election in Ohio, 1886 (elected by state legislature):
John Sherman (R) (inc.): 84 (57.53%)
Allen G. Thurman (D): 62 (42.47%)

United States Senate election in Ohio, 1892 (elected by state legislature):
John Sherman (R) (inc.): 111 (75%)
James E. Neal (D): 37 (25%)

Sources

References

Sherman, John